Frithiof Rudén is a retired Swedish footballer. Rudén was part of the Djurgården Swedish champions' team of 1917 and 1920. Rudén made 5 appearances for Sweden and scored 0 goals.

Honours

Club 
 Djurgårdens IF 
 Svenska Mästerskapet (2): 1917, 1920

References

Swedish footballers
Djurgårdens IF Fotboll players
Sweden international footballers
Association football goalkeepers
Year of birth missing